The Yamaha FZ16 (called Yamaha Byson in Indonesia) is a standard motorcycle made by Yamaha since 2008. The FZ16 is modeled after the FZ1. The FZ16 is primarily sold in India, and other markets such as Indonesia, China, Colombia and Argentina.

In 2014, the fuel-injected version, called FZ FI, went on sale in India.

In 2015, the Indonesian Byson FI went on sale. According to Yamaha, the bike has 91 different components from the version that sold in India.

Yamaha FZ25 (FZ250) 
In 2017, Yamaha launched the FZ25, a 250 cc derivative of the FZ series. It also has an air-cooled, 2-valve, fuel-injected engine. Yamaha said the FZ25 is aimed at existing Yamaha owners. MotorBeam tested the FZ25 and found it to offer "smooth performance" with "excellent engine refinement". The bike is also sold in Brazil as the Fazer 250.

In 2019, the third generation model of the FZ and FZ-S was introduced in India.

FZ16 Fazer 
The FZ16 Fazer or FZ16ST is the semi-faired version of the FZ16, similar in manner to the FZ8-S and FZ1-S Fazer. It has twin headlights instead of single, and the riding position has slightly altered to accommodate long distance riding.

FZ-S 
The FZ-S is launched after FZ16 with an aerodynamic windshield and additional 45mm in height, both of which are very successful bikes in India.

FZ-S FI 
The new FZ series, which consists of the FZ FI and FZS FI models, is powered by a 149 cc, fuel-injected, BS-VI engine that is lighter and has a side stand engine cutoff switch.The body's weight has been decreased from 137 kg to 135 kg, making it easier for riders to navigate and improving their handling comfort. The FZS FI variant also includes the Bluetooth-enabled "Yamaha Motorcycle Connect X," which, among other features, offers various features including "Answer back," "E-lock," "Locate my bike," and "Hazard" alert.

References

External links 
 

FZ16
Standard motorcycles
Motorcycles introduced in 2008